Swamp leek orchid is a common name for several plants and may refer to:

Prasophyllum drummondii, endemic to Western Australia
Prasophyllum frenchii, endemic to south-eastern Australia
Prasophyllum hectori, endemic to New Zealand